University of Aleppo (also called Aleppo University) is a public university located in Aleppo, Syria. It is the second largest university in Syria after the University of Damascus.

During 2005–06, the University had over 61,000 undergraduate students, over 1,500 post graduate students and approximately 2,400 faculty members. The university has 25 faculties and 10 intermediate colleges.

History

What was to become the University of Aleppo consisted of a Faculty of Engineering in Aleppo opened in 1946 and affiliated to what is now the University of Damascus (Syrian University at that time). After the end of French rule in 1946, the newly independent Syria only had one university. 

In 1958, the Syrian government passed a law that created the University of Aleppo as the second university in the country.  When the new university opened its doors in 1960, it consisted of two faculties (Civil Engineering and Agriculture). The University grew rapidly in the subsequent decades, formed respected programs in engineering, sciences, and literature, as well as a strong emphasis on languages, offering courses on German, Russian, French, and English.

The university is member of the European Permanent University Forum (EPUF), the Mediterranean Universities Union (UNIMED) and the Regional Corporation Confremo. 

The university has joint co-operative programmes with many international institutions of higher educations from the Arab World, United States, Argentina, Venezuela, Australia, Japan, India, Malaysia, Iran, Armenia, Georgia, Turkey, Kazakhstan, Russia, Spain, United Kingdom, Germany, France, Italy, Austria, Norway, Poland, Ukraine, Belgium, Bosnia and Herzegovina, Hungary and Moldova.

During 2008, the University of Aleppo marked its golden jubilee.

On 15 January 2013, 82 people were killed during the Aleppo University bombings. The blasts reportedly struck an area between Aleppo University's halls of residence and the architecture faculty. The initial death toll was 52, but Aleppo's governor later revised the number.

Structure

Faculties
Aleppo University consists of 25 faculties with 152 departments, among which 18 faculties are located in Aleppo and 7 in Idlib. Studying period is 4 years or above:

 Civil Engineering founded in 1946 as a faculty affiliated with the Syrian University in Damascus. Later in 1958, it became the first faculty of the newly established University of Aleppo:
Basic sciences
Topographic engineering
Structural engineering
Engineering management and Construction
Geotechnical engineering
Transportation engineering
Hydraulic engineering
Environmental engineering
 Agriculture founded in 1960: 
Basic sciences
Agricultural economics
Animal production
Horticulture
Renewable natural resources and Environment
Soil science and Land reclamation
Food science
Agronomy
Rural engineering
Plant protection
 Law founded in 1960: 
Commercial law
International law
Public law
Penal law
Private law
 Arts and Humanities founded in 1966:

Arabic language and literature
French language and literature
English language and literature
History
Geography
Philosophy and Sociology
Archeology
Armenian language and literature
Persian Language and literature
 Economics founded in 1966:

Business administration
Accounting
Statistics and Information systems
Economics
Marketing
Banking and Finance
 Sciences founded in 1966:
Mathematics
Physics
Chemistry
Biological Sciences
Geology
Statistics
 Medicine founded in 1967:
Neurology
Internal medicine
General surgery
Histopathology
Dermatology
Anesthesia and recovery
Obstetrics and gynaecology
Pediatrics
Physiology
Medical laboratory
Anatomy
Tumors
Eye diseases and surgery
Medical radiography
Forensic science
Organ systems
Pharmacology
Family medicine
 Dentistry founded in 1979:
Oral and maxillofacial surgery
Periodontology
Oral Medicine
Pediatric dentistry
Fixed prosthodontics
Orthodontics and maxillofacial
Prosthodontics
Dental restoration
Biological and Medical sciences
Histology and Histopathology
Basic Dental science
 Electrical and Electronic Engineering founded in 1982:.
Electrical engineering
Telecommunications engineering
Electrical Power engineering
Mechatronics
Electronic engineering
Computer engineering
Control engineering and Automation
 Architecture founded in 1983:
Architectural design
Planning and Environment
Building science and Implementation
Architectural theory and history
 Mechanical Engineering founded in 1983:
Basic sciences
Applied mechanics
Power engineering
Production engineering
Industrial engineering
Agricultural machinery engineering
Nuclear engineering
Aerospace engineering
Materials science
Mechanical spinning and weaving
 Pharmacy founded in 1991:
Analytical and Food chemistry
Pharmaceutical chemistry and Drug controlling
Biochemistry
Impact of drugs and toxins
Pharmacognosy
Pharmaceutics and Pharmaceutical technology
 Pedagogy founded in 1997:
School teacher
Counseling psychology
Teaching methods
 Informatics founded in 2000:
Artificial intelligence and Natural language processing
Software engineering and systems
Network engineering
Basic sciences
 Technological Engineering founded in 2002:
Environmental engineering
Food technology
Biotechnology
Biomedical engineering
Water Resources engineering
 Fine Arts founded in 2006:
Drawing and painting
Sculpture
Graphics
Visual communication
Interior architecture
Wall painting
Parietal and ceramic art
Graphic design and layout
Textile and fashion design
Animation
 Sharia founded in 2006:
Islamic theology
Islamic jurisprudence and principles
 Nursing founded in 2007:
Nursing for adults
Pediatric nursing
Obstetrical and gynecological nursing
Psychiatric and mental health nursing
Public health nursing
Nursing management
Critical care nursing
Geriatric nursing
 Agriculture II in Idlib founded in 2005:
Agricultural studies
Olive production
 Education II in Idlib founded in 2005.
 Arts and Humanities II in Idlib founded in 2005:
Arabic language and literature
English Language and literature
Archeology
 Law II in Idlib founded in 2006:
Commercial law
International law
Public law
Penal law
Private law
 Sciences II in Idlib founded in 2007:
Mathematics
 Veterinary medicine in Idlib founded in 2010.
 Administrative sciences in Idlib founded in 2011.

Higher institutes
Two higher institutes based in Aleppo are operating in the university:
 Higher Institute of the History of Arabic Science founded in 1976:
History of Applied sciences
History of Medical sciences
History of Basic sciences
 Higher Institute of Languages founded in 2003.

Intermediate technical institutes
The university has 12 intermediate technical institutes with eight of them based in Aleppo and four in Idlib. Studying period is for two years:
 Medicine
 Dentistry
 Informatics
 Engineering
 Agriculture
 Technical College of Banking and Finance
 Business administration and Marketing
 Mechanical and Electrical
 Informatics in Idlib
 Banking and Finance in Idlib
 Veterinary in Idlib
 Agriculture in Idlib

Open Studies
The Open Studies Centre was inaugurated in 2001. The centre offers degrees in three majors:
Legal studies
Computer and informatics
Minor and intermediate projects

Hospitals

The university runs six hospitals in the city of Aleppo:
 Aleppo University Hospital (AUH)
 Aleppo University Cardiovascular Surgical Centre
 OB/GYN Hospital named after Basil al-Assad
 Oral and Maxillofacial Surgical Centre
 Surgical Ambulance Hospital
 Al-Kindi Hospital (currently not operating)

Other structures
The university is home to one of the biggest libraries (Central Library of the University) in Syria with more than 1.5 million units. In addition, there are 17 academic centres, a publishing and printing house, and 20 units in the campus, designated to host more than 12 thousand students.

The university publishes its scientific journal periodically which is called Aleppo University Researches.

On 7th of February 2010, the university announced the opening of its Radio & TV Centre, which is the first of its type among Syrian universities and the third in the Middle East.

Presidents 
 Dr. Tawfik Al-Munajed (1960–67)
 Dr. Mustafa Ezzat Al-Nassar (1968–69)
 Dr. Ahmad Y. al-Hassan (1973–79)
 Dr. Mohammad Ali Hourieh (1979–2000)
 Dr. Saeed Farhoud (2001–04)
 Dr. Mohammad Nizar Akil (2005–10)
 Dr. Nidal Shehadeh (2010-2012)
 Dr. Abed Yakan (2012)
 Dr. Kheder Ourfali (2012-2013)
 Dr. Mahmoud Dahhan (2013–14)  
 Dr. Mustafa Afuni (2015-present)

Notable alumni
 Wajih Azaizeh, Jordanian politician
 Mohammad Nidal al-Shaar, Syrian politician and economist
 Muhammad bin Jamil Zeno, Islamic scholar
 Zuhair Masharqa, Syrian politician
 Sufian Allaw, Syrian politician
 Ibtisam Ibrahim Teresa, award-winning Syrian novelist
 Khaled Khalifa, award-winning Syrian novelist
 Abdulrazak Eid, Syrian writer and thinker
 Muhammed Abu Maatouk, Syrian playwright
 Darin Ahmad, Syrian artist, poet and writer
 Mustafa Setmariam Nasar, al-Qaeda member
 Fathallah Omar, writer
 Muhamad Aly Rifai, Syrian American internist and psychiatrist
 Mazloum Abdi, Syrian Kurdish PKK and SDF commander
 Waad Al-Kateab Academy Award nominated film director of For Sama (2019)
Kenan Yaghi, current Finance Minister of Syria

References

 
Aleppo
Education in Aleppo
Educational institutions established in 1958
Libraries in Syria
1958 establishments in Syria